The big-headed African mole rat (Tachyoryctes macrocephalus), also known as the giant root-rat, Ethiopian African mole rat, or giant mole rat, is a rodent species in the family Spalacidae.
It is endemic to Ethiopia's Bale Mountains.  Its natural habitat is subtropical or tropical high-altitude grassland, where it can reach densities of up to 2,600 individuals per square kilometre. It is threatened by habitat loss. Where the two species overlap, it is the main prey of the endangered Ethiopian wolf (Canis simensis).

Big-headed African mole rats are highly distinctive in their large size, especially that of their heads. They are a mottled golden-brown in color, and are soft-furred.

While the other mole rats not only live but also feed underground, this species mostly forages above ground, by digging a new tunnel to a patch of herbage. It forages for about 20 minutes, until it has exhausted the supply of herbs about its tunnel, after which it blocks the tunnel it has built from the inside. It mostly eats grasses and herbs, with some individuals feeding mostly on roots. It retains its specialisations for digging tunnels because of the constant threat of predators, especially the Ethiopian wolf, which is specialised to a diet of mole rats. Ethiopian wolves catch mole rats by ambushing them after they have constructed a new foraging tunnel, chasing them into their tunnel, and then vigilantly waiting for them to resurface. These mole rats have evolved defenses other than flight, though, being very cautious and having incisors large enough to severely injure potential predators.

References

Tachyoryctes
Endemic fauna of Ethiopia
Mammals of Ethiopia
Bale Mountains
Fauna of the Ethiopian Highlands
Mammals described in 1842
Taxa named by Eduard Rüppell
Endangered animals
Endangered biota of Africa
Taxonomy articles created by Polbot
Ethiopian montane moorlands